Group E of the 1986 FIFA  World Cup was one of the groups of nations competing at the 1986 FIFA World Cup.  The group's first round of matches began on 4 June and its last matches were played on 13 June. Matches were played at the Estadio La Corregidora in Querétaro and at the Estadio Neza 86 in Nezahualcóyotl. Impressive debutantes Denmark topped the group - surprisingly beating Germany 2-0 despite having a man sent off: they were joined in the second round by West Germany who would go on to reach the final. 3 red cards were handed out in this group, 2 of them against Uruguay who made the second round but were criticized for their physical play, especially in their last group game against Scotland where José Batista was sent off in under a minute. Scotland Manager Sir Alex Ferguson made the surprise decision to leave out captain Souness and  passed responsibility on to Strachan and Albiston, a move with which Ferguson would later recall "his biggest mistake in football" and despite being a man up, Scotland were unable to score, the match finishing 0-0, and Uruguay went through in third place instead.

Before the tournament, English-language media reported Uruguay manager Omar Borrás's description of it as the "group of death", popularising a phrase first used in Spanish in the 1970 World Cup.

Standings

Matches

Uruguay vs West Germany

Scotland vs Denmark

West Germany vs Scotland

Denmark vs Uruguay

Denmark vs West Germany

Scotland vs Uruguay

References

Group C
Group
Group
Group
Group